"Like What" is the only single by British girl group Tommi. It was their first release and also turned out to be their last before disappearing off the music scene. The single charted at number 12 on the UK Singles Chart, remaining within the top 40 for a total of eight weeks.

Track listing
UK CD 1
"Like What" (radio edit)
"He's a Galist" (album version)
"Like What" (Kardinal Beats salsa remix)

UK CD 2
"Like What" (video edit)  
"Like What" (Cedsolo radio mix)  
"Like What" (Juliano creator remix)

Chart positions

References

2003 songs
2003 debut singles
Sony Music UK singles
Pop-rap songs
Song articles with missing songwriters